Paraclanculus is a genus of sea snails, marine gastropod mollusks in the family Trochidae, the top snails.

Description

Species
Species within the genus Paraclaculus include:

The following species were brought into synonymy
 Paraclanculus peccatus Finlay, 1926 : synonym of Clanculus (Paraclanculus) peccatus (Finlay, 1926)

References

 Bruce Marshall, A review of the Recent Trochini of New Zealand (Mollusca: Gastropoda: Trochidae; Molluscan Research Volume 19, Issue 1, 1998)

External links
 World Register of Marine Species

Trochidae
Gastropods described in 1926